Transformation Ministries is a Christian network of churches in the United States. The headquarters is in Covina, California.

History
It was originally formed in 1895 as the Southern California Baptist Convention.  Later, in 1995, it was renamed as American Baptist Churches of the Pacific Southwest.  Then in 2006, when the American Baptist Churches of the Pacific Southwest separated  from the American Baptist Churches USA due to a disagreement with how ABC USA enforced membership alliances and ordination appointments in light of theological differences and disparity in core tenets of Biblical interpretation, it renamed as Transformation Ministries. 

Today there are TM Churches in thirteen (13) states and Northern Mexico (Tijuana).   Since 2015, TM has established minisitry hubs in Houston, Indianapolis and Miami as part of the expansion of the movement beyond their historical footprint in the American southwest.

According to a denomination census released in 2022, it claimed 240 churches.

References

External links

Baptist denominations in the United States
Christian organizations established in 1895
2006 establishments in the United States